Trogtalite is a rare selenide mineral with the formula CoSe2. It crystallizes in the cubic system and is part of the pyrite group, consisting of Co2+ and Se22− ions. It has a rose-violet colour and its crystals are opaque. It often occurs as grains. It was thought to be dimorphous with hastite, but this was discredited in 2009. Hastite turned out to be the iron selenide mineral ferroselite. It forms a solid solution series with krut'aite.

Occurrence 
Trogtalite was first found in 1955 in Trogtal quarry, Lautenthal, Harz Mountains, Germany, after which it was also named. It often occurs intergrown with clausthalite grains at this locality. It has also been found in the Musonoi Cu–Co mine, Kolwezi, Katanga Province, Congo and in Argentina, in Tuminico, Sierra de Cacho, and in Los Llantenes, La Rioja Province. It is often found together with clausthalite, ferroselite, bornhardtite, native selenium, gold, and oosterboschite.

See also 
 List of minerals

References 

Selenide minerals
Cobalt minerals
Cubic minerals
Minerals in space group 205